aka Koichiro Uno's Wet Strike is a 1984 Japanese film in Nikkatsu's Roman Porno series, directed by Shūsuke Kaneko and starring Natsuko Yamamoto and Arisa Hayashi. It was the 21st film in Nikkatsu's series of films based on the works of author Kōichirō Uno.

Synopsis
Similar characters to that in the manga include "Madam Butterfly", a rich snob of a professional tennis player, and Hiromi, her suffering opponent.

Cast
 Natsuko Yamamoto as Hiromi Hosokawa
 Arisa Hayashi as Madame Butterfly
 Yūgo Sawada
 Satoru Harada
 Rika Ishii

Critical appraisal
Shūsuke Kaneko won the Yokohama Film Festival award for best new director for this film.

Legacy
Kōichirō Uno's Wet and Swinging was Shūsuke Kaneko's directorial debut. He turned his early success in the Roman porno / pink film genre into a mainstream directorial career. Today he is best known for his films in the kaijū film genre, such as Gamera: Guardian of the Universe (1995) and Godzilla, Mothra & King Ghidorah: Giant Monsters All-Out Attack (2001).

Availability
Kōichirō Uno's Wet and Swinging was released on DVD in Japan on October 21, 2005, as part of Geneon's first wave of Nikkatsu Roman porno series.

References

Bibliography

English

Japanese
 
 
 
 
 
 
 

Films directed by Shusuke Kaneko
1984 films
1980s Japanese-language films
Nikkatsu films
Nikkatsu Roman Porno
1980s Japanese films